Andrew Lue (born March 17, 1992) is a retired Canadian football defensive back. In the CFL's Amateur Scouting Bureau final rankings, he was ranked tenth best of the players eligible in the 2014 CFL Draft. He was then drafted tenth overall by the Montreal Alouettes and signed with the team in May 2014. He was then traded to the Saskatchewan Roughriders on October 12, 2016. On February 14, 2017 hew signed a contract with the Edmonton Eskimos. He then signed a contract with the Ottawa Redblacks on February 15, 2018.

Early years 
Lue was born in Kingston, Jamaica and raised in Toronto, and Markham, Ontario. He played football and basketball at St. Brother André Catholic High School, where he competed as a wide receiver, defensive back and running back. He was a perennial all-star and was listed as a top 25 prospect in the Toronto area.

University career 
Lue attended Queen's University where he majored in Biology and Environmental Science. He played CIS Football as a starter for the Queen's Gaels as a cornerback for 4 years. He was named to the USports All-Canadian football team as a cornerback in 2011 and 2013, and named to the OUA All-Star football team in 2011, 2012 and 2013. He was invited to the 2014 CFL Combine where he  jumped 10 ft 5 inches; to lead all participants in the broad jump, and tied for 5th for his vertical jump of 36.5". He graduated in May 2014 on the Dean's List and as an Academic All-Canadian.

Professional career 
Lue was drafted tenth overall by the Montreal Alouettes and signed with the team in May 2014.

Montreal Alouettes 
Lue recorded his first tackle on June 28, 2014. He played with the Alouettes for 3 seasons.

Saskatchewan Roughriders 
Lue signed with the Saskatchewan Roughriders on October 12, 2016.

Edmonton Eskimos 
Lue signed with the Edmonton Eskimos on February 14, 2017.

Ottawa Redblacks 
Lue signed with the Ottawa Redblacks on February 15, 2018.

References

External links
Ottawa Redblacks bio

1992 births
Living people
Canadian football defensive backs
Edmonton Elks players
Montreal Alouettes players
Players of Canadian football from Ontario
Ottawa Redblacks players
Queen's Golden Gaels football players
Saskatchewan Roughriders players
Sportspeople from Markham, Ontario